Colonel Sir Thomas Courtenay Theydon Warner, 1st Baronet  (19 July 1857 – 15 December 1934) was a British politician, who served as the Member of Parliament (MP) for North Somerset from 1892 to 1895, and for Lichfield from 1896 to 1923.

Warner was an officer in the 3rd (Militia) Battalion, Oxfordshire and Buckinghamshire Light Infantry, where he became major on 13 January 1902. He received the honorary rank of lieutenant-colonel on 2 August 1902, and later served as lieutenant-colonel in command and honorary colonel of the battalion. He received the CB on 25 June 1909, and was made a baronet on 9 July 1910, of Brettenham Park, Suffolk.

Initially a member of the Liberal Party, he stood at the 1918 general election as a Coalition Liberal, and at the 1922 general election as National Liberal. He was also the first mayor of the Municipal Borough of Walthamstow after its incorporation in 1929. 

Sir Courtenay Warner lived in the former Manor House of Highams, which was sold to Essex County Council 1922 for £7000. It is now Woodford County High School for Girls. Plans were drawn up to construct housing for the middle classes on 90 acres of the estate; this development is known as the Highams Estate and was completed in 1934.

He gave his name to the Warner Flats on the Warner Estate, the popular type of housing in Walthamstow which he was responsible for developing. His ancestors built the Grade II listed Clock House villa in Walthamstow (now flats).

His grave lies in the churchyard of St Mary's, Thorpe Morieux, Suffolk.

References

External links 
 Highams Residents' Association website: http://highamsra.org/index.html

1857 births
1934 deaths
Baronets in the Baronetage of the United Kingdom
Companions of the Order of the Bath
Liberal Party (UK) MPs for English constituencies
Lord-Lieutenants of Suffolk
UK MPs 1892–1895
UK MPs 1895–1900
UK MPs 1900–1906
UK MPs 1906–1910
UK MPs 1910
UK MPs 1910–1918
UK MPs 1918–1922
UK MPs 1922–1923
Mayors of places in Greater London
Oxfordshire and Buckinghamshire Light Infantry officers
National Liberal Party (UK, 1922) politicians